Stereogum Presents... OKX: A Tribute to OK Computer is a free, downloadable tribute album to celebrate the tenth anniversary of Radiohead's OK Computer. The tribute album features songs by a variety of bands including the Cold War Kids, Vampire Weekend, My Brightest Diamond, and The Twilight Sad. It was made available in July 2007 online at Stereogum's music blog website.

Track listing 
(All tracks written by Thom Yorke, Jonny Greenwood, Phil Selway, Ed O'Brien, and Colin Greenwood.)

"Airbag", performed by Doveman – 5:50
"Paranoid Android", performed by Slaraffenland – 5:46
"Subterranean Homesick Alien", performed by Mobius Band – 4:12
"Exit Music (For a Film)", performed by Vampire Weekend – 3:55
"Let Down", performed by David Bazan's Black Cloud – 5:53
"Karma Police", performed by John Vanderslice – 4:00
"Fitter Happier", performed by Samson Dalonoga feat. The Found Sound Orchestra – 2:01
"Electioneering", performed by Cold War Kids – 3:20
"Climbing Up the Walls", performed by The Twilight Sad – 5:22
"No Surprises", performed by Marissa Nadler feat. Black Hole Infinity – 4:40
"Lucky", performed by My Brightest Diamond – 4:14
"The Tourist", performed by Flash Hawk Parlor Ensemble – 5:56

B-Sides
"No Surprises", performed by Northern State – 3:34
"Polyethylene (Parts 1 & 2)", performed by Chris Walla – 4:21

External links
Stereogum's original article for OKX, where the album is now available as a download only
OKX extended article, published in 2015
Stereogum's original sub-site for OKX, where the album was available to stream and download free-of-charge, now redirects to a b-sides article

Albums free for download by copyright owner
2007 compilation albums
Radiohead tribute albums